Harouna Sy (born 30 March 1996) is a French professional footballer who plays as a left-back for Greek Super League club Volos.

Career
On 29 July 2021, Sy joined Amiens on a two-year contract.

Personal life
Born in France, Sy is of Mauritanian descent.

References

1996 births
Living people
French footballers
French expatriate footballers
Footballers from Rouen
French sportspeople of Mauritanian descent
Association football defenders
AS Poissy players
Red Star F.C. players
K.S.V. Roeselare players
USL Dunkerque players
Amiens SC players
Ligue 2 players
Challenger Pro League players
Championnat National players
Championnat National 2 players
Expatriate footballers in Belgium
French expatriate sportspeople in Belgium